Conțești is a commune in Dâmbovița County, Muntenia, Romania. It is composed of eight villages: Bălteni, Boteni, Călugăreni, Conțești, Crângași, Gămănești, Heleșteu and Mereni.

References

Communes in Dâmbovița County
Localities in Muntenia